John Dick (3 October 1912 – 29 March 2002) was a New Zealand rugby union player. A wing three-quarter, Dick represented Auckland and, briefly, Canterbury, at a provincial level, and was a member of the New Zealand national side, the All Blacks, in 1937 and 1938. He played five matches for the All Blacks including three internationals.

During World War II, Dick served with the Royal New Zealand Air Force (RNZAF), and played in forces matches representing the RNZAF in 1943.

References

1912 births
2002 deaths
People educated at Auckland Grammar School
New Zealand rugby union players
New Zealand international rugby union players
Auckland rugby union players
Canterbury rugby union players
Rugby union wings
New Zealand military personnel of World War II
Royal New Zealand Air Force personnel
Rugby union players from Auckland